Kid Kool and the Quest for the Seven Wonder Herbs is a video game released for the Nintendo Entertainment System in 1988 by Vic Tokai. (ja:Kakefu-kun)

Kid Kool is also one of the games featured in the Japanese Show GameCenter CX.

Summary

Kid Kool is a platform game akin to the Mario series. There is also a small red creature, "Wicky", that the player can carry, which will eliminate enemies when thrown.

The main character is on a quest to obtain seven herbs needed to help cure a king from an illness. The game will gradually progress from "day" to "night" modes as a timer counts down, with each cycle taking one hour in play time. There are multiple endings to the game, with the ending gained based on the time taken to complete the game. These range from the king having died if the player takes more than three hours, to being given four other rewards, starting with a bag of money for the fourth best ending, a bag of gold and a high position in the kingdom for the third ending, a chest of gems and the princess for the second ending, and finally a chest of gems, the princess, and the promise to rule the kingdom for the best ending.

The Vic Tokai games Decap Attack (Magical Hat no Buttobi Tābo! Daibōken in Japan) and Psycho Fox are part of the same family of games, sharing various design similarities.

Notes

References

External links
Kid Kool and the Quest for the Seven Wonder Herbs at GameFAQs

1988 video games
Nintendo Entertainment System games
Nintendo Entertainment System-only games
Platform games
Side-scrolling video games
Vic Tokai games
Video games developed in Japan